Katalin Laki (née Tóth Harsányi, born 2 April 1948 in Debrecen) is a former Hungarian handball player and Olympic medalist. She has been capped 121 times for the Hungarian national team between 1971 and 1976. She participated on three World Championships, winning the bronze in 1971 and 1975, followed by another bronze on the 1976 Summer Olympics in Montreal. On the Olympic tournament she played in all five matches and scored seven goals.

References

External links
Profile on Database Olympics

1948 births
Living people
Sportspeople from Debrecen
Hungarian female handball players
Handball players at the 1976 Summer Olympics
Olympic handball players of Hungary
Olympic bronze medalists for Hungary
Olympic medalists in handball
Medalists at the 1976 Summer Olympics